Media of the Soviet Union includes:

 Broadcasting in the Soviet Union
 Radio in the Soviet Union
 Television in the Soviet Union
 Printed media in the Soviet Union
 Censorship in the Soviet Union
 Propaganda in the Soviet Union

See also
 Media in Russia

Mass media in the Soviet Union